Lai Hang (1928 – 9 February 1965) was a Chinese actor who began his acting career at age 4.

Early life 
Lai was born in Shanghai, Republic of China. Lai's parents were Japanese-born filmmaker Lai Man-wai and Canadian-born actress Lim Cho Cho.

Career 
Lai appeared in many films with his mother in the 1930s. One of Lai's most notable roles was in The Goddess (1934), which was voted one of the top 30 Chinese films of all time at the 2005 Hong Kong Film Awards.

Personal life 
Lai is also known as Henry Lai, Henry Lai Hang, and Li Keng.

Though his parents both resided in Hong Kong after the Chinese Communist Revolution, Lai Hang chose to remain in mainland China to dedicate himself to the Communist cause. He was attacked in 1963 during the Socialist Education Movement because his older sister Lai Lan lived in Taiwan with her husband Shen Chang-huan, who was a high-ranking Republic of China diplomat. 

Lai's marriage also fell apart, and in 1965 Lai Hang committed suicide by hanging himself from a tree.

Filmography

Film

References

External links

1928 births
1965 deaths
Lingnan University (Guangzhou) alumni
Chinese male silent film actors
Chinese male film actors
20th-century Chinese male actors
Male actors from Shanghai
Suicides in the People's Republic of China
Suicides by hanging in China
Chinese male child actors
1965 suicides